The 14th Pan American Games were held in Santo Domingo, Dominican Republic from August 1 to August 17, 2003.

Medals

Bronze

Men's Time Trial: Benjamín Martínez

Women's doubles

Results by event

Athletics

Track

Road

Cycling

Mountain Bike
Yamil Carlos Montaño
 Men's Cross Country — + 1 lap (→ 6th place)

Triathlon

See also
 Bolivia at the 2004 Summer Olympics

References

Nations at the 2003 Pan American Games
P
2003